Dąbki  is a spa village in the administrative district of Gmina Darłowo, within Sławno County, West Pomeranian Voivodeship, in north-western Poland. It is located on the Slovincian Coast.

The village has a population of 265.

References

Villages in Sławno County
Spa towns in Poland
Populated coastal places in Poland
Seaside resorts in Poland